The 1918–19 Idaho Vandals men's basketball team represented the University of Idaho during the  college basketball season. The Vandals were led by first-year head coach  and played their home games on campus at the  Armory and Gymnasium in Moscow, Idaho.

The Vandals were  overall.

References

External links
Sports Reference – Idaho Vandals: 1918–19 basketball season
Gem of the Mountains: 1920 (spring 1919) University of Idaho yearbook – 1918–19 basketball season
Idaho Argonaut – student newspaper – 1919 editions

Idaho Vandals men's basketball seasons
Idaho
Idaho
Idaho